How Ya Like Me Now is the second solo studio album by American rapper Kool Moe Dee from the Treacherous Three. It was recorded at Battery Studios in London, England and released on November 3, 1987, via Jive Records.

Production of the album was handled by Teddy Riley, Bryan "Chuck" New, LaVaba Mallison, Pete Q. Harris and Kool Moe Dee. The record peaked at #35 on the Billboard 200 and #4 on the Top R&B/Hip-Hop Albums. It is his best-selling album to date, achieving platinum certification by the RIAA. The album has spawned three singles: "How Ya Like Me Now", "Wild Wild West" and "No Respect".

Recording and production 
Mixing and recording for How Ya Like Me Now took place in London at Battery Studios. Alongside Kool Moe Dee, audio production was shared with and handled by Teddy Riley, Bryan "Chuck" New, LaVaba Mallison and Pete Q. Harris, with whom he worked on his previous self-titled album.

On the front cover made by Doug Rowell, Moe Dee takes musical aim at rival rapper LL Cool J, by crushing a red Kangol hat under a front wheel of the Jeep Wrangler in the backdrop. The long running feud began when Kool Moe Dee claimed that LL had stolen his rap style. He also felt that LL was disrespecting rap pioneers like Melle Mel and Grandmaster Caz, by proclaiming that he was "rap's new grandmaster" without paying due respect to those who came before him. The feud persisted into the mid-1990s with more songs, and ended with both MCs proclaiming themselves the victor.

The photograph was taken on 4th St in Manhattan between Avenues C and D in Alphabet City, in an empty lot across from the San Isidoro y San Leandro Western Orthodox Catholic Church of the Hispanic Mozarabic Rite. Moe Dee references aspects the neighborhood in lyrics on the album.

Release and promotion 
Following Kool Moe Dee, How Ya Like Me Now was released through Jive Records with distribution by RCA Records, making it Kool Moe Dee's second album on the label. It was dropped on November 3, 1987, and was supported by three singles: "How Ya Like Me Now", "Wild Wild West" and "No Respect", and its music videos.

Its self-titled single peaked at #22 on the US Billboard Hot R&B/Hip-Hop Songs and #86 on the UK Singles Chart. "Wild Wild West" peaked at #62 on the US Billboard Hot 100 and #4 on the US Billboard Hot R&B/Hip-Hop Songs. The single "No Respect" did not get into any major music chart.

Reception

Commercial 
Reaching a peak position of number thirty-five on the US Billboard 200, How Ya Like Me Now remained on the chart for a total of 50 weeks. The album has been certified gold by the Recording Industry Association of America on April 14, 1988, and then went platinum on November 14, 1988, indicating US sales of over one million units.

Critical 

In a contemporary review, the Washington Post compared the album to work by hip hop artists Schooly D and LL Cool J, stating that Kool Moe Dee "comes across like a hip guidance couselor" and that the album was a "def aural collage: James Brown beats on the title cut, Queen on "Rock You" even Paul Simon on "50 Ways". The production is sophisticated without sacrificing the improvisational swagger that is central to rap's appeal." American music journalist Robert Christgau described the album as "out-of-kilter swing generated by his electronic percussion lie there—trick rhymes, variable lengths, filters, double tracks, sung refrains, and the occasional extra instrument all work to shift the beat without undercutting its dominance". Alex Henderson of AllMusic said that Kool Moe Dee "had a major hit with his sophomore effort" and "it definitely has its share of classics".

Accolades 
In 2017, the album was ranked #35 on Consequence of Sound Top 50 Albums of 1987, and #41 of Complex 50 Greatest Rap Albums 1980s.

Legacy
In 2008, the title track "How Ya Like Me Now" was ranked #31 on VH1's 100 Greatest Hip Hop Songs.

In 2017, the song "How Ya Like Me Now" was used in the Empire episode "Strange Bedfellows".

Track listing

Personnel
Mohandes Dewese – vocals, producer
Bryan Chuck New – mixing, engineer, producer
Edward Theodore Riley – producer
Peter Brian Harris – producer
LaVaba Mallison – producer
Doug Rowell – photography
Kofi Tuda – grooming

Charts 

Album

Singles

Certifications

References

External links 

1987 albums
Albums produced by Teddy Riley
Jive Records albums
Kool Moe Dee albums
New jack swing albums
RCA Records albums